Arequipa is a province in the Arequipa Region, Peru. Its capital, Arequipa, is Peru's second most populous province of Peru. It borders the provinces of Islay, Camaná, Caylloma, and the Cusco and Puno regions. According to INEI in the year 2014 it has a population of 958.351 people.

Geography 
Some of the highest peaks of the province are Chachani, the Misti volcano and Pikchu Pikchu. Other mountains are listed below:

Political division
The province is divided into twenty-nine districts (singular: distrito).

Ethnic groups 
The province is inhabited by indigenous citizens of Aymara and Quechua descent. Spanish, however, is the language which the majority of the population (85.67%) learnt to speak in childhood, 1.64% of the residents started speaking using the Aymara language and 12.35% using Quechua (2007 Peru Census).

See also 
 Añaswayq'u
 Arequipa metropolitan area
 Chinaqucha
 History of Peru
 Spanish conquest of Peru
 Urququcha

Sources

External links 
 Arequipa Region 

Arequipa Province